Appias pandione is a butterfly in the family Pieridae. It was described by Carl Geyer in 1832. It is found in  the Indomalayan realm.

Subspecies
A. p. pandione (Java)
A. p. ozolia Fruhstorfer, 1910 (Sumatra)
A. p. whiteheadi Grose-Smith, 1887 (northern Borneo)
A. p. lagela (Moore, 1878) (southern Burma to Peninsular Malaysia)
A. p. montanus Rothschild, 1896 (Philippines: Negros)
A. p. zamora (C. & R. Felder, 1862) (Philippines: Mindoro)

References

External links
Appias at Markku Savela's Lepidoptera and Some Other Life Forms

Appias (butterfly)
Butterflies described in 1832